Euxoa is a genus of moths of the family Noctuidae raised to Genus by the German entomologist, Jacob Hübner. 
The Genus is mostly confined to dry and semi dry areas in the Northern Hemisphere. There 130 species in Eurasia, a few in Africa, and 175 in North America. There are no species in the Genus in South-East Asia or in Australia. In North America, most species are found in Western regions. Of the North American species, 4 are endemic to Mexico. There is one species recorded from Chile, but this may be a mislabeled specimen. 
In real terms, species numbers do not equal species abundance. Some areas with few species have large numbers of the ones that do live there. 

In North America there are 7 subgenera - Chorizagrotis, Palaeoeuxoa, Heteroeuxoa,Longivesica, Pleuonectopoda, Orstagrotis, and Euxoa.

The larvae of this Genus are Cutworms, living in the soil but feeding on the surface. A few species also climb. Most larval Euxoa hatch from eggs laid in autumn, and most go though a summer diapause, before pupating when the temperature drops later in the summer. 
The Genus includes the prolific miller moths, which are full adult army cutworms labeled as the species Euxoa auxiliaris and common in North America.

Species

 Euxoa aberrans McDunnough, 1932
 Euxoa absona Lafontaine, 1987
 Euxoa acuminifera (Eversmann, 1854)
 Euxoa adumbrata (Eversmann, 1842)
 Euxoa aequalis (Harvey, 1876)
 Euxoa agema (Strecker, 1899)
 Euxoa albipennis (Grote, 1876)
 Euxoa altens McDunnough, 1946
 Euxoa anarmodia (Staudinger, 1897)
 Euxoa annulipes (Smith, 1890)
 Euxoa antica Lafontaine, 1974
 Euxoa apopsis Troubridge & Lafontaine, 2010
 Euxoa aquilina (Denis & Schiffermüller, 1775)
 Euxoa atomaris (Smith, 1890)
 Euxoa atristrigata (Smith, 1890)
 Euxoa aurantiaca Lafontaine, 1974
 Euxoa auripennis Lafontaine, 1974
 Euxoa aurulenta (Smith, 1890)
 Euxoa austrina Hardwick, 1968
 Euxoa auxiliaris (Grote, 1873) – army cutworm
 Euxoa baja Lafontaine, 1987
 Euxoa basalis (Grote, 1879)
 Euxoa basigramma (Staudinger, 1870)
 Euxoa beatissima (Rebel, 1917)
 Euxoa bicollaris (Grote, 1878)
 Euxoa bifasciata (Smith, 1888)
 Euxoa biformata Smith, 1910
 Euxoa birivia (Denis & Schiffermüller, 1775)
 Euxoa bochus (Morrison, 1874)
 Euxoa bogdanovi (Erschoff, 1873)
 Euxoa bostoniensis (Grote, 1874)
 Euxoa brevipennis (Smith, 1888)
 Euxoa brunneigera (Grote, 1876)
 Euxoa camalpa (Dyar, 1912)
 Euxoa campestris (Grote, 1875)
 Euxoa cana Lafontaine, 1974
 Euxoa canariensis Rebel, 1902
 Euxoa cashmirensis Hampson 1903
 Euxoa castanea Lafontaine, 1981
 Euxoa catenula (Grote, 1879)
 Euxoa centralis (Staudinger, 1899)
 Euxoa chimoensis Hardwick, 1966
 Euxoa choris (Harvey, 1876)
 Euxoa christophi (Staudinger, 1870)
 Euxoa churchillensis (McDunnough, 1932)
 Euxoa cicatricosa (Grote & Robinson, 1865)
 Euxoa cinchonina (Guenée, 1852)
 Euxoa cincta Barnes & Benjamin, 1924
 Euxoa cinereopallida (Smith, 1903)
 Euxoa cinnabarina Barnes & McDunnough, 1918
 Euxoa citricolor (Grote, 1880)
 Euxoa clauda Püngeler, 1906
 Euxoa clausa McDunnough, 1923
 Euxoa coconino Lafontaine, 1987
 Euxoa cognita (Staudinger, 1881)
 Euxoa comosa (Morrison, 1876)
 Euxoa cona (Strecker, 1898)
 Euxoa conjuncta (Smith, 1890)
 Euxoa conspicua (Hübner, [1827])
 Euxoa continentalis Reisser, 1935
 Euxoa cos (Hübner, [1824])
 Euxoa costata (Grote, 1876)
 Euxoa crassilinea (Wallengren, 1860)
 Euxoa crypta (Dadd, 1927)
 Euxoa cryptica Hardwick, 1968
 Euxoa culminicola (Staudinger, 1870)
 Euxoa cursoria (Hufnagel, 1766) – coast dart
 Euxoa dargo (Strecker, 1898)
 Euxoa declarata (Walker, 1865)
 Euxoa decora (Denis & Schiffermüller, 1775)
 Euxoa deficiens (Wagner, 1913)
 Euxoa derrae Hacker, 1985
 Euxoa deserta (Staudinger, 1870)
 Euxoa deserticola I.Kozhantshikov, 1937
 Euxoa detersa (Walker, 1856)
 Euxoa diaphora Boursin, 1928
 Euxoa difformis (Smith, 1900) (syn: Euxoa mercedes Barnes & McDunnough, 1912)
 Euxoa dissona (Möschler, 1860)
 Euxoa distinguenda (Lederer, 1857)
 Euxoa divergens (Walker, [1857])
 Euxoa dodi McDunnough, 1923
 Euxoa edictalis (Smith, 1893)
 Euxoa emma L. G. Crabo & A. Crabo, 2007
 Euxoa emolliensis (Hampson, 1905)
 Euxoa enixa (Püngeler, 1906)
 Euxoa eruta (Hübner, [1827])
 Euxoa excogita (Smith, 1900)
 Euxoa extranea (Smith, 1888)
 Euxoa fallax (Eversmann, 1854)
 Euxoa faulkneri Mustelin, 2000
 Euxoa fissa Staudinger, 1895
 Euxoa flavicollis (Smith, 1888)
 Euxoa flavidens (Smith, 1888)
 Euxoa flavogrisea Corti, 1932
 Euxoa foeda (Lederer, 1855)
 Euxoa foeminalis (Smith, 1900)
 Euxoa franclemonti Lafontaine, 1987
 Euxoa fumalis (Grote, 1873)
 Euxoa furtivus (Smith, 1890)
 Euxoa fuscigera (Grote, 1874) (sometimes misspelled as fuscigerus)
 Euxoa glabella Wagner, 1930
 Euxoa goetria I.Kozhantshikov, 1929
 Euxoa guadalupensis Lafontaine & Byers, 1982
 Euxoa hardwicki Lafontaine, 1987
 Euxoa hastifera (Donzel, 1848)
 Euxoa haverkampfi (Standfuss, 1893)
 Euxoa henrietta (Smith, 1900)
 Euxoa heringi (Staudinger, 1877)
 Euxoa hilaris (Freyer, 1838)
 Euxoa hollemani (Grote, 1874) (syn: Euxoa andera Smith, 1910)
 Euxoa homicida (Staudinger, 1900)
 Euxoa hyperborea Lafontaine, 1987
 Euxoa idahoensis (Grote, 1878)
 Euxoa immixta (Grote, 1881)
 Euxoa inconcinna (Harvey, 1875)
 Euxoa infausta (Walker, 1865)
 Euxoa infracta (Morrison, 1875)
 Euxoa inscripta Lafontaine, 1981
 Euxoa intermontana Lafontaine, 1975
 Euxoa intolerabilis (Püngeler, 1902)
 Euxoa intrita (Morrison, 1875)
 Euxoa inyoca Benjamin, 1936
 Euxoa juliae Hardwick, 1968
 Euxoa karschi (Graeser, [1890] 1889)
 Euxoa laetificans Smith, 1894
 Euxoa lafontainei Metzler & Forbes, 2009
 Euxoa latro (Barnes & Benjamin, 1926)
 Euxoa lecerfi Zerny, 1934
 Euxoa leuschneri Lafontaine, 1987
 Euxoa lewisi (Grote, 1873)
 Euxoa lewisi lewisi (Grote, 1873)
 Euxoa lewisi julia Hardwick, 1968
 Euxoa lilloeet McDunnough, 1927
 Euxoa lineifrons (Smith, 1890)
 Euxoa lucida Barnes & McDunnough, 1912
 Euxoa luctuosa Lafontaine, 1976
 Euxoa macleani McDunnough, 1927
 Euxoa macrodentata Hardwick, 1965
 Euxoa maderensis Lafontaine, 1976
 Euxoa maimes (Smith, 1903)
 Euxoa malickyi Varga, 1990
 Euxoa manitobana McDunnough, 1925
 Euxoa mansour (Le Cerf, 1933)
 Euxoa medialis (Smith, 1888)
 Euxoa melana Lafontaine, 1975
 Euxoa melura McDunnough, 1932
 Euxoa mendelis Fernández, 1915
 Euxoa messoria (Harris, 1841) – reaper dart
 Euxoa mimallonis (Grote, 1873)
 Euxoa misturata (Smith, 1890)
 Euxoa mitis (Smith, 1894)
 Euxoa mobergi Fibiger, 1990
 Euxoa moerens (Grote, 1883)
 Euxoa mojave Lafontaine, 1987
 Euxoa montana (Morrison, 1875)
 Euxoa montivaga Fibiger, 1997
 Euxoa muldersi Lafontaine & Hensel, 2010
 Euxoa munis (Grote, 1879)
 Euxoa murdocki (Smith, 1890)
 Euxoa mustelina (Christoph, 1876)
 Euxoa nevada (Smith, 1900)
 Euxoa nevadensis Corti, 1928
 Euxoa nigricans (Linnaeus, 1761) – garden dart
 Euxoa nigrofusca (Esper, 1788) – White-line Dart
 Euxoa niveilinea (Grote, [1883])
 Euxoa nomas Erschoff, 1874 (syn: Euxoa incognita (Smith, 1894))
 Euxoa nostra (Smith, 1890)
 Euxoa nyctopis Hampson, 1903
 Euxoa obelisca (Denis & Schiffermüller, 1775) – square-spot dart
 Euxoa obeliscoides (Guenée, 1852)
 Euxoa oberfoelli Hardwick, 1973
 Euxoa oblongistigma (Smith, 1888)
 Euxoa occidentalis Lafontaine & Byers, 1982
 Euxoa ochrogaster (Guenée, 1852) – redbacked cutworm
 Euxoa olivalis (Grote, 1879)
 Euxoa olivia (Morrison, 1876)
 Euxoa oncocnemoides (Barnes & Benjamin, 1926)
 Euxoa oranaria (Bang-Haas, 1906)
 Euxoa pallidimacula Lafontaine, 1987
 Euxoa pallipennis (Smith, 1888)
 Euxoa penelope Fibiger, 1997
 Euxoa perexcellens (Grote, 1875)
 Euxoa permixta McDunnough, 1940
 Euxoa perolivalis (Smith, 1905)
 Euxoa perpolita (Morrison, 1876)
 Euxoa pestula Smith, 1904
 Euxoa phantoma (Kozhanchikov, 1928)
 Euxoa pimensis Barnes & McDunnough, 1910
 Euxoa piniae Buckett & Bauer, 1964
 Euxoa plagigera (Morrison, 1875)
 Euxoa pleuritica (Grote, 1876)
 Euxoa pluralis (Grote, 1878)
 Euxoa powelli (Oberthür, 1912)
 Euxoa punctigera (Walker, 1865)
 Euxoa quadridentata (Grote & Robinson, 1865)
 Euxoa quebecensis (Smith, 1900)
 Euxoa recula (Harvey, 1876)
 Euxoa recussa (Hübner, [1817])
 Euxoa redimicula (Morrison, 1875)
 Euxoa ridingsiana (Grote, 1875)
 Euxoa riversii (Dyar, 1903)
 Euxoa robiginosa (Staudinger, 1895)
 Euxoa rockburnei Hardwick, 1973
 Euxoa rufula (Smith, 1888)
 Euxoa rugifrons (Mabille, 1888)
 Euxoa sabuletorum (Boisduval, 1840)
 Euxoa satiens (Smith, 1890)
 Euxoa satis (Harvey, 1876)
 Euxoa sayvana Ronkay, Varga & Hreblay, 1998
 Euxoa scandens (Riley, 1869)
 Euxoa scholastica McDunnough, 1920
 Euxoa scotogrammoides McDunnough, 1932
 Euxoa sculptilis (Harvey, 1875)
 Euxoa segnilis (Duponchel, 1837)
 Euxoa selenis (Smith, 1900)
 Euxoa septentrionalis (Walker, 1865)
 Euxoa serotina Lafontaine, 1975
 Euxoa serricornis (Smith, 1888)
 Euxoa servita (Smith, 1895) (sometimes misspelled as servitus)
 Euxoa setonia McDunnough, 1927
 Euxoa shasta Lafontaine, 1975
 Euxoa shasta shasta Lafontaine, 1975
 Euxoa shasta condita Lafontaine, 1975
 Euxoa sibirica (Boisduval, [1837])
 Euxoa siccata (Smith, 1893)
 Euxoa silens (Grote, 1875)
 Euxoa simona McDunnough, 1932
 Euxoa simulata McDunnough, 1946
 Euxoa sinelinea Hardwick, 1965
 Euxoa spumata McDunnough, 1940
 Euxoa stigmatalis (Smith, 1900)
 Euxoa stygialis (Barnes & McDunnough, 1912)
 Euxoa subandera Lafontaine, 1987
 Euxoa taura Smith, 1905 (syn: Euxoa cooki McDunnough, 1925)
 Euxoa teleboa (Smith, 1890)
 Euxoa temera (Hübner, [1808])
 Euxoa terrealis (Grote, 1883)
 Euxoa terrena (Smith, 1900) (sometimes misspelled as terrenus)
 Euxoa tessellata (Harris, 1841)
 Euxoa tibetana (Moore 1878)
 Euxoa tocoyae (Smith, 1900)
 Euxoa triaena Kozhanchikov, 1929
 Euxoa trifasciata (Smith, 1888)
 Euxoa tristicula (Morrison, 1875)
 Euxoa tristis (Staudinger, 1898)
 Euxoa tritici (Linnaeus, 1761) – whiteline dart
 Euxoa tronellus (Smith, 1903)
 Euxoa unica McDunnough, 1940
 Euxoa ustulata Lafontaine, 1976
 Euxoa vallus (Smith, 1900)
 Euxoa vallus vallus (Smith, 1900)
 Euxoa vallus luteosita (Smith, 1900)
 Euxoa vallus bivittata (Smith, 1900)
 Euxoa velleripennis Lafontaine, 1987
 Euxoa vernalis Lafontaine, 1976
 Euxoa vetusta (Walker, 1865)
 Euxoa violaris (Grote & Robinson, 1868)
 Euxoa vitta (Esper, 1789)
 Euxoa wagneri Corti, 1926
 Euxoa westermanni (Staudinger, 1857)
 Euxoa wilsoni (Grote, 1873)
 Euxoa xasta Barnes & McDunnough, 1910
 Euxoa zernyi Boursin, 1944

References

 
 

 
Noctuinae
Taxa named by Jacob Hübner